This article is about the caves of Poland.

Geographic distribution

Tatra Mountains

, there are 843 caves known in the Polish Tatra Mountains with the total length exceeding 134 km. They are within Tatra National Park. All the prominent ones are limestone karst caves of the Western Tatras, but there are also some tectonic caves. The largest and deepest caves of the Tatras (and of Poland) are located in the Czerwone Wierchy and Kominiarski Wierch massifs. Another highly promising region, the massif of Giewont, is largely unexplored due to its strict nature conservation status.

 Bańdzioch Kominiarski
 Bliźniacza Studnia
 Dudnica
 Dudowa Studnia
 Dziura
 Dziura Wyżnia – Jaskinia Lisia
 Dziurka w Trawce
 Górne Kominy
 Jasiowa Dziura
 Jaskinia Bystrej
 Jaskinia Czarna
 Jaskinia Goryczkowa
 Jaskinia Kalacka
 Jaskinia Kamienne Mleko
 Jaskinia Kasprowa Niżnia
 Jaskinia Kasprowa Średnia
 Jaskinia Kasprowa Wyżnia
 Jaskinia Kozia
 Jaskinia Lejbusiowa
 Jaskinia Lodowa Małołącka
 Jaskinia Lodowa Miętusia
 Jaskinia Lodowa Mułowa
 Jaskinia Lodowa w Ciemniaku
 Jaskinia Lodowa w Twardych Spadach
 Jaskinia Magurska
 Jaskinia Mała w Mułowej
 Jaskinia Małołącka
 Jaskinia Marmurowa
 Jaskinia Miętusia
 Jaskinia Miętusia Wyżnia
 Jaskinia Mroźna
 Jaskinia Mylna
 Jaskinia Naciekowa
 Jaskinia nad Zagonem
 Jaskinia Obłazkowa
 Jaskinia pod Dachem
 Jaskinia pod Okapem
 Jaskinia pod Wantą (Litworowy Dzwon)
 Jaskinia Poszukiwaczy Skarbów
 Jaskinia Przeziorowa
 Jaskinia przy Przechodzie
 Jaskinia Psia
 Jaskinia Raptawicka
 Jaskinia Śpiących Rycerzy
 Jaskinia Śpiących Rycerzy Wyżnia
 Jaskinia w Czubie Jaworzyńskiej
 Jaskinia Wielka Śnieżna — longest, largest, and deepest cave in Poland
 Jaskinia Wodna pod Pisaną
 Jaskinia Wodna pod Raptawicką
 Jaskinia Wysoka – Jaskinia za Siedmiu Progami
 Jaskinia Wyżnia Litworowa
 Jaskinia za Płytą (Dziura z Kośćmi Kozicy)
 Jaskinia Zakosista
 Jaskinia Zimna
 Jaskinia Zośka – Zagonna Studnia
 Jędrusiowa Dziura
 Komin w Kazalnicy
 Komin w Ratuszu
 Koprowa Studnia
 Mnichowa Studnia Wyżnia
 Niebieska Studnia
 Piwnica Miętusia 
 Pomarańczarnia
 Ptasia Studnia
 Śnieżna Studnia
 Studnia w Dziurawem
 Studnia w Kazalnicy
 Studnia w Progu Mułowym
 Studnia za Murem
 Szara Studnia
 Szczelina Chochołowska
 Tunel Małołącki
 Tylkowa Szczelina
 Zielone Kominy

Pieniny 
 Jaskinia nad Polaną Sosnówką
 Jaskinia Pienińska
 Jaskinia w Ociemnem
 Jaskinia Wyżna

Jura 
In the area of  Kraków-Częstochowa Upland there are over 1800 known limestone caves, most of them shorter than 100m and rather shallow.
Tunel Wielki, an archaeological site.

Beskids and Subcarpathia

Sudetes 
 Aven w Połomie, Wojcieszów
 Jaskinia Biały Kamień
 Jaskinia Błotna, Wojcieszów
 Jaskinia Imieninowa, Nowe Rochowice
 Jaskinia Kontaktowa, Stara Morawa
 Jaskinia Kryształowa, Wojcieszów (destroyed)
 Jaskinia na Ścianie, Rogóżka
 Jaskinia Niedźwiedzia, Kletno
 Jaskinia Nowa, Wojcieszów
 Jaskinia Pajęcza, Wojcieszów
 Jaskinia Północna Duża, Wojcieszów
 Jaskinia Radochowska, Radochów
 Jaskinia z Filarami – Jaskinia Prosta, Kochanów
 Jaskinia z Rondami, Kochanów
 Szczelina Wojcieszowska, Wojcieszów
 Złota Sztolnia, Duszniki-Zdrój

Świętokrzyskie 

 Chelosiowa Jama – Jaskinia Jaworznicka, Jaworznia
 Jaskinia Pajęcza, Jaworznia
 Paradise Cave, Dobrzączka
 Jaskinia Zbójecka, Łagów
 Prochownia, Jaskinia Odkrywców, Kielce
 Szczelina na Kadzielni, Kielce

Nida Basin 
Gypsum karst caves of the Nida syncline.
 Jaskinia Sawickiego, Bronina
 Jaskinia Skorocicka, Skorocice
 Jaskinia u Ujścia Doliny, Skorocice
 Jaskinia w Aleksandrowie, Aleksandrów
 Jaskinia w Gackach, Gacki

Gdańsk Pomerania 

 Grota Mirachowska I (Schron z Kolumnami), Mirachowo
 Grota Mirachowska II (Schronisko Owalne), Mirachowo
 Jaskinia Bajka I, Gądecz
 Jaskinia Bajka II, Gądecz
 Jaskinia Goryla, Gdynia
 Jaskinia Klonowa, Grudziądz
 Jaskinia pod Wierzbą, Grudziądz
 Jaskinia Śpiącego Szweda, Gdynia
 Jaskinia w Mechowie, Mechowo
 Schronisko w Połchowie, Połchowo

Tourist caves 
There are currently 17 tourist caves in Poland.

Show caves 
Show caves, with guided tours and requiring an entrance fee:
 Jaskinia Ciemna, Ojców National Park
 Jaskinia Dziurawy Kamień, Sudetes
 Jaskinia Łokietka, Ojców National Park
 Jaskinia Mroźna, Western Tatras
 Jaskinia Niedźwiedzia, Sudetes
 Jaskinia Nietoperzowa, Polish Jura Chain
 Jaskinia Radochowska, Sudetes
 Jaskinia Raj, Świętokrzyskie
 Jaskinia w Mechowie, Gdańsk Pomerania
 Jaskinia Wierzchowska Górna, Polish Jura
 Smocza Jama, Kraków

Other 
Other caves made accessible to the general public as part of a tourist trail:
 Dziura, Western Tatras
 Jaskinia Malinowska, Silesian Beskids
 Jaskinia Mylna, Western Tatras
 Jaskinia Obłazkowa, Western Tatras
 Jaskinia Raptawicka, Western Tatras
 Smocza Jama, Western Tatras

Records 
 The largest and deepest cave:
 Jaskinia Wielka Śnieżna in the Western Tatras, with the length of 23.723 km and vertical range of 824 m
 The largest horizontal extent:
 Jaskinia Miętusia in the Western Tatras, with the horizontal extent of ca. 1135 m
 The highest cave:
 Świnicka Koleba, a tiny tectonic granite cave in mount Świnica in the High Tatras, at ca. 2250 m above sea level
 The deepest underground pitch:
 Studnia Wazeliniarzy (pun – "lickspittles shaft" or "vaseliners shaft") in Śnieżna Studnia in the Western Tatras, with the depth of ca. 230 m
 The largest underground chamber:
 Sala Fakro in Jaskinia Mała w Mułowej in the Western Tatras, with the size of ca. 85 × 35 × 90 m
 The largest underground lake:
 Wielki Kłamca ("the great pretender") in Ptasia Studnia in the Western Tatras, with the size of ca. 6 × 20 m
 The oldest human species in Poland:
Tunel Wielki

Biology 

Notable troglobionts, troglophiles, and trogloxenes of Polish caves include:

Crustaceans 
 Acanthocyclops languidoides clandestinus
 Bathynella natans
 Niphargus tatrensis
 Proasellus slavus
 Synurella ambulans tenebrarum

Arachnids 
 Lobohalacarus weberi quadriporus
 Meta menardi – European cave spider
 Oribella cavatica
 Porrhomma moravicum
 Pseudanophthalmus pilosellus

Insects 
 Arrhopalites pygmaeus
 Catops tristis infernus
 Choleva lederiana
 Mesogastrura ojcoviensis
 Onychiurus alborufescens
 Protaphorura janosik

Bats 
17 out of 21 species of Polish bats can be found in caves – most of them only in winter, during their hibernation.

 Barbastella barbastellus – Barbastelle
 Eptesicus nilssoni – Northern bat
 Eptesicus serotinus – Serotine bat
 Myotis bechsteini – Bechstein's bat
 Myotis brandti – Brandt's bat
 Myotis dasycneme – Pond bat
 Myotis daubentoni – Daubenton's bat
 Myotis emarginatus – Geoffroy's bat
 Myotis myotis – Greater mouse-eared bat
 Myotis mystacinus – Whiskered bat
 Myotis nattereri – Natterer's bat
 Nyctalus noctula – Common noctule
 Plecotus auritus – Brown long-eared bat
 Plecotus austriacus – Grey long-eared bat
 Rhinolophus ferrumequinum – Greater horseshoe bat
 Rhinolophus hipposideros – Lesser horseshoe bat
 Vespertilio murinus – Parti-coloured bat

Conservation

Exploration

See also 
 List of caves

References

External links 

 Epimenides cave page
 Jaskinie (The Caves) – Polish speleo magazine
 Polish-English caving dictionary 

 
Poland
Caves